Coup of Gods is a 2021 album by Iranian composer and arranger Mehdi Rajabian. The album was released 17 September 2021 in the United States.

In August 2020, Rajabian was arrested and placed on trial. Rajabian stated that the arrest followed a media interview about the album and the charges were due to the album including vocals from female artists. Rajabian's difficulties in making the album received significant media coverage.

Track listing

References 

Persian music
Middle Eastern music
Mehdi Rajabian albums
2021 albums